Perfect World is the third Japanese studio album (fifth overall) by South Korean girl group Twice. It was released on July 28, 2021, by Warner Music Japan. The album features 10 tracks, including the title track, "Perfect World", and three previously released singles, "Fanfare", "Better", and "Kura Kura".

Background and release 
On May 19, 2021, a photo teaser was posted on Twice's Japanese social media accounts. On June 22, the track listing was revealed. Two teasers for the title track, "Perfect World", were posted before its release on June 29. The album was released on July 28.

Commercial performance 
Perfect World debuted at number 2 on the Oricon Albums Chart for the chart issue dated July 26 – August 1, 2021. The album debuted at number 1 on the Billboard Japan Hot Albums for the chart issue dated August 4, 2021.

Track listing

Charts

Weekly charts

Year-end charts

Certifications

Release history

See also 
 List of Billboard Japan Hot Albums number ones of 2021

References 

2021 albums
Twice (group) albums
Japanese-language albums
Warner Music Japan albums